Oakridge School may refer to:
 The Oakridge School, Arlington, Texas, United States
 Oakridge High School (Oregon), Oakridge, Oregon, United States
 Oakridge International School, Hyderabad, Andhra Pradesh, India
 Oakridge Secondary School, London, Ontario, Canada

See also
 Oak Ridge High School (disambiguation)
 Oakridge Public Schools - a public school district in Egelston Township, Michigan, United States